Mylor Creek (meaning creek of boats) is a tidal ria in south Cornwall, United Kingdom. It is a tributary of Carrick Roads, the estuary of the River Fal and is situated approximately six miles (10 km) south of Truro and two miles (3 km) north of Falmouth
.

Geography
The creek is in Mylor civil parish and forms an inland tidal lake.

Locations
 Normal Tidal Limit (NTL) at Mylor Bridge coordinates     
 Mouth (Mylor Harbour) coordinates

History
At the entrance to the creek was the most westerly naval dockyard and victualling station in Britain, which, at high tide, covered  of water. During the second half of the 19th-century it was the base for HMS Ganges, a training ship for boys, and also the Falmouth Packets. During World War II the harbour was a base for operations conducted by the French Resistance. It is now home to the last remaining fleet of oyster fishermen.

Recreation
Carrick Roads and Cornwall's English Channel coast are popular for yachting and dinghy racing. Restronguet Sailing Club (which takes its name from Restronguet Creek a mile to the north) has its base at  Mylor Harbour, a large yacht marina immediately north of Mylor Churchtown.

References

French Resistance
Populated coastal places in Cornwall
Rivers of Cornwall
Royal Navy dockyards in England